Mohammed Yassine Mansouri (born April 2, 1962) is a Moroccan dignitary who is serving the director of Morocco's external intelligence agency, the General Directorate for Studies and Documentation since February 16, 2005. He previously served as the director of the Moroccan state-owned press agency, Maghreb Arabe Presse in November 1999, then as Director-General of Home Affairs at the Ministry of the Interior.

Biography 
Mansouri was born in Boujad, near Beni Mellal, in 1962. He is the son of Hajj Abderrahmane Mansouri, a religious professor and preacher from Bzou who moved to Boujad after his retirement. He was a classmate of Mohammed VI at the Royal College in Rabat. He received a law degree and two graduate degrees in public law in 1983 from Mohammed V University. He started his career at the Ministry of Information and later the Ministry of the Interior.

Personal life

He was described in a biography written by Driss Bennani for TelQuel as "extremely reserved and discreet, even shy". Mansouri is married and has 4 children.

See also
Fouad Ali El Himma
Mounir Majidi
Abdellatif Hamouchi

References

Living people
People from Boujad
Moroccan civil servants
1963 births
Alumni of the Collège Royal (Rabat)
Directors of intelligence agencies
People of Moroccan intelligence agencies